Luigi Bonos (1910–2000) was an Italian comedian and stage, television and film actor. He appeared in more than 70 films between 1945 and 1992.

Born in Berlin, Germany, the son of two Hungarian circus artists, along with his brothers Vittorio (1908 - 1966) and Giovanni (1907-1956) Bonos formed a trio of comedians who met large success in the avanspettacolo and revue theater between the 1930s and 1940s. He made his film debut in 1951, and since then he appeared in dozens of comedy films, usually as a character actor. He died in 2000.

Selected filmography

 L'ippocampo (1945) - Un acrobato
 The Whole City Sings (1945)
 Era lui... sì! sì! (1951) - Cameriere
 The Overcoat (1952) - (uncredited)
 Primo premio: Mariarosa (1952)
 I morti non pagano tasse (1952)
 The Tired Outlaw (1952)
 Era lei che lo voleva (1954) - The Cook at Invernaghi's (uncredited)
  Laugh! Laugh! Laugh! (1954) - Mimo
 Tunis Top Secret (1959) - Pedro
 The Last Judgment (1961)
 Colpo gobbo all'italiana (1962)
 Damon and Pythias (1962)
 I motorizzati (1962) - Franco
 The Girl Who Knew Too Much (1963) - Albergo Stelletta
 Il segno di Zorro (1963) - padre Diaz 
 Gidget Goes to Rome (1963) - Museum Official (uncredited)
 Castle of the Living Dead (1964) - Marc
 Killer Caliber .32 (1967) - Alonso - Mine Worker (uncredited)
 The Biggest Bundle of Them All (1968) - Old House Owner (uncredited)
 Madigan's Millions (1968) - Lift operator 
 The Longest Hunt (1968) - Sgt. Peck 
 Indovina chi viene a merenda? (1969) - German Soldier 
  (1969) - Taubenheim, Kunsthändler
 The Thirteen Chairs (1969) - Dicky (uncredited)
 Oh, Grandmother's Dead (1969)
 Madame Bovary (1969) - Herzog von Artois
 The Five Man Army (1969) - Priest (uncredited)
 The Secret of Santa Vittoria (1969) - Benedetti
 And God Said to Cain (1970) - Joë
 Paths of War (1970) - Barman (uncredited)
 Formula 1 - Nell'inferno del Grand Prix (1970)
 I Am Sartana, Trade Your Guns for a Coffin (1970) - Posada Owner
 L'asino d'oro: processo per fatti strani contro Lucius Apuleius cittadino romano (1970) - Husband of Birrena
 Mr. Superinvisible (1970)
 Defeat of the Mafia (1970) - Giulio
 They Call Me Trinity (1970) - Ozgur - Bartender
 Fantasia Among the Squares (1971) - Le Sheriff
 La Poudre d'escampette (1971) - Un soldat italien sur la plage 
 Armiamoci e partite! (1971) - Baron's Adjutant
 Trinity Is Still My Name (1971) - Bartender Ozgur
 Si può fare molto con 7 donne (1972) - Costa
 Chronicle of a Homicide (1972)
 I due gattoni a nove code... e mezza ad Amsterdam (1972) - Big Bon
 What? (1972) - Painter
 Finalmente... le mille e una notte (1972) - Baba
 Frankenstein 80 (1972) - Hobo
 Now They Call Him Sacramento (1972) - Old Tequila
 Lo chiamavano Verità (1972) - Pierre, the Waiter
 Even Angels Eat Beans (1973) - Italian Merchant (uncredited)
 Sinbad and the Caliph of Baghdad (1973) - Firùz
 ...e così divennero i 3 supermen del West (1973) - Professor Aristide Panzarotti
 Più forte sorelle (1973) - Timothy
 Pasqualino Cammarata, Frigate Captain (1974)
 Laß jucken, Kumpel 3. Teil - Maloche, Bier und Bett (1974) - Luckys Vater
 Sesso in testa (1974)
 Charleston (1974) - Hotel Porter (uncredited)
 Il sergente Rompiglioni diventa... caporale (1975)
 The Flower in His Mouth (1975) - Canaino
 The Exorcist: Italian Style (1975) - Dr. Schnautzer
 La nipote del prete (1976) - Prete
 San Pasquale Baylonne protettore delle donne (1976) - Antonio Pocaterra
  (1976) - Art Director (uncredited)
 Death Rage (1976) - Peppiniello
 Merciless Man (1976)
 Carioca tigre (1976) - Talazar 
 Il signor Ministro li pretese tutti e subito (1977) - Fulgenzio Cherubini
 March or Die (1977) - Andre
 Mad Dog (1977) - Pappalardo
 Grazie tante - Arrivederci (1977)
 Lo chiamavano Bulldozer (1978) - Bulldozers pal, trying to build him a new motor drive
 The Sheriff and the Satellite Kid (1979) - Deputy Allen
 Bertoldo, Bertoldino e Cacasenno (1984)
 Il burbero (1986) - Una guardia
 They Call Me Renegade (1987) - Bartender
 There Was a Castle with Forty Dogs (1990) - Barritore d'asta 
 The King's Whore (1990) - 2nd Priest
 À demain (1992)
 Once a Year, Every Year (1994)

References

External links

1910 births
2000 deaths
Italian male film actors
20th-century Italian male actors